Canoparmelia consanguinea is a species of saxicolous (rock-dwelling), foliose lichen in the family Parmeliaceae. Found in Brazil, it was formally described as a new species in 2009 by lichenologists Marcelo Marcelli, Luciana da Silva Canêz, and John Elix.

Description

The lobes are irregularly branched, loosely attached to the surface, and slightly overlap each other. The tips are rounded, and the edges are smooth or have slight waves. The surface can be smooth or slightly cracked in the middle and shiny. There are no  or  present, but there are reticulate  (a type of marking) on the distal areas. The soralia (reproductive structures) are circular and black when old, found on both the surface and edges of the thallus. The medulla is white, and there is no purple pigment produced when exposed to K chemical. The lower surface of the thallus is black and can be dull or slightly shiny. It may have small bumps or be smooth in some parts. The outer edges are brown and can be smooth or slightly bumpy. The rhizines (root-like structures) are black, some with whitish tips, and can be simple or have a brush-like appearance.

Apothecia (another type of reproductive structure) are rare and flat, attached to the surface and have a diameter of 2.7 mm. The edges can be smooth or have soredia. The  are ellipsoid and measure 10.0–12.5 by 5.0–6.0 μm with a thin outer layer measuring 1.0 μm.  (another reproductive structure) are immature and not visible in this species.

Major lichen products in Canoparmelia consanguinea are olivetolcarboxylic acid, decarboxynorstenosporic acid, and 4-O-demethylstenosporic acid; there are several other substances that occur in minor or trace amounts.

References

Parmeliaceae
Lichen species
Lichens described in 2009
Lichens of Brazil
Taxa named by John Alan Elix